Alistair Robert "Ally" Mitchell (born 3 February 1968) is a Scottish retired professional footballer. He was a versatile utility player who excelled in the attacking midfield position. He is nicknamed "Bully" and is 5'7" tall.

Career

Playing career
Mitchell signed for East Fife from Ballingry Rovers in 1988, and in three seasons made 87 league appearances, scoring 23 goals. Mitchell moved from East Fife to Kilmarnock in July 1991 for a fee of £100,000. In 12 years at Kilmarnock, Mitchell made 363 league appearances, scoring 45 goals. He is perhaps best remembered for scoring a match-winning goal for Kilmarnock against Rangers at Ibrox Stadium that effectively handed the 1997–98 league championship to Celtic, and thereby stopped Rangers' attempt to win ten league titles in succession.

After leaving Kilmarnock in January 2003, Mitchell enjoyed a 12-game spell with St Mirren, before signing for Brechin City in June 2003. In three seasons with Brechin, Mitchell made 74 league appearances, scoring 2 goals. In July 2006 Mitchell re-signed for East Fife, and made 3 league appearances in his one season there.

Management career
Mitchell later became player-manager for Lochore Welfare.

References

External links

1968 births
Living people
Footballers from Kirkcaldy
Scottish Football League players
Scottish football managers
Scottish footballers
Scottish Premier League players
East Fife F.C. players
Kilmarnock F.C. players
St Mirren F.C. players
Brechin City F.C. players
Association football midfielders
Lochore Welfare F.C. players